John James Harker (10 October 1876 – 1962) was an English professional footballer who played as an inside forward for Sunderland.

References

1876 births
1962 deaths
People from County Durham (district)
Footballers from County Durham
English footballers
Association football inside forwards
Sunderland A.F.C. players
English Football League players